Sparse binary polynomial hashing (SBPH) is a generalization of Bayesian spam filtering that can match mutating phrases as well as single words. 

SBPH is a way of generating a large number of features from an incoming text automatically, and then using statistics to determine the weights for each of those features in terms of their predictive values for spam/nonspam evaluation.

External links 
 A paper on the subject as it relates to spam (some article text comes from this document, which is under the GFDL)

Bayesian statistics
Spam filtering